The President of Biafra was the head of state of the Republic of Biafra, a secessionist state in south-eastern Nigeria which existed from 30 May 1967 to 15 January 1970.  Biafra had two presidents during its existence.

List of presidents of Biafra

See also
History of Nigeria
Nigerian Civil War

External links
World Statesmen - Biafra

Biafra

History of Nigeria
Biafra
Nigeria-related lists